This is a list of Canadian films which were released in 2012:

See also
 2012 in Canada
 2012 in Canadian television

References

External links
Feature Films Released In 2012 With Country of Origin Canada at IMDb
2013 Canadian Screen Awards nominees 
2013 Canadian Screen Awards winners 
Canada's Top Ten for 2012 (lists of top ten Canadian features and shorts, selected in a process administered by TIFF)

2012
2012 in Canadian cinema
Canada